is a Japanese manga series written and illustrated by Yone Sawata. It was serialized in Shueisha's shōjo manga magazine Ribon from February 2017 to December 2022, with its chapters collected in five tankōbon volumes. An anime television series adaptation by Voil is set to premiere in 2024.

Characters

Media

Manga
Written and illustrated by Yone Sawata, Acro Trip was serialized in Shueisha's shōjo manga magazine Ribon from February 3, 2017, to December 1, 2022; it was Sawata's first serialized work. Shueisha collected its chapters in five tankōbon volumes, released from April 25, 2018, to January 25, 2023.

Volume list

Anime
An anime television series adaptation was announced on December 1, 2022. It is produced by Voil and directed by Ayumu Kotake, with scripts supervised by Shinichi Inotsume, and character designs by Toshie Kawamura. The series is set to premiere in 2024.

Reception
The manga was recommended by manga artist Aka Akasaka.

References

External links
  
  
 

Anime series based on manga
Comedy anime and manga
Magical girl anime and manga
Shōjo manga
Shueisha manga
Television shows set in Niigata Prefecture